This is the list of radio programmes broadcast in Estonia. The list is incomplete.

See also 
 List of Estonian television programs

References 

 
Estonia
Radio